h is the debut extended play of Lee Haeri, one half of South Korean duo Davichi. It was released on April 19, 2017.

The album consisted of "Pattern" and "Hate That I Miss You", both serves as the album's title track.

"Pattern" is a groovy medium-tempo track that expertly combines charismatic bass and Lee Hae-ri's chic voice, a collaborative effort of singer-songwriter Sunwoo Jung-A and producer realmeee, resulting in quite a different sound and style from Davichi.

"Hate That I Miss You" is a traditional ballad track, which delivers deep and heart-breaking emotions.

Release
On April 6, 2017, it was revealed that Lee was working on her solo mini album and planned for a mid-April release. This is her first solo release 9 years after her debut as Davichi.

On April 11, 2017, Lee released her first official solo track "Pattern", a pre-release for her solo debut album h. She also announced that the music video would be released on April 12.

On April 17, 2017, Lee released the full track list for the solo album.

On April 19, 2017, Lee released the music video for her 2nd title track "Hate That I Miss You".

Track listing

Chart performance

Albums chart

Sales and certifications

Release history

References

External links
 
 

Davichi albums
2017 debut EPs
Korean-language EPs
Stone Music Entertainment EPs